The Box and Blocks Test is a functional test used in upper limb rehabilitation. The test is used to measure the gross manual dexterity of a patient, or of a person using an upper limb prosthetic device.

The test consists of a box with a partition in the middle. Blocks are placed at one side of the partition. The box is placed at a table. The test subject is seated, facing towards the box. During the tests the test subject is given 60 seconds to move as many blocks as possible from one side to the other, by using only his tested hand. The tested hand can be either the subjects own hand or a prosthetic device operated by the subject. The number of displaced blocks is a measure of the gross manual dexterity. A higher number of displaced blocks indicates a better gross dexterity. The outcome can be compared to reference values of healthy test subjects, or reference values of tests performed with a prosthesis. The Box and Blocks Test enables measuring progress of gross hand dexterity during rehabilitation.

References

Musculoskeletal examination
Rehabilitation medicine